China Uncensored is a YouTube commentary channel that focuses on sensitive political issues in China with elements of humor and irony. The show opposes the Chinese Communist Party (CCP). Chris Chappell is the host of the series. Until 2020, the YouTube show was compiled into longer 30-minute episodes aired by New York-based New Tang Dynasty Television, which is affiliated with Falun Gong, a new religious movement persecuted in China. NTD added Chinese subtitles to these longer episodes and broadcast them into mainland China.

Vox has described the show as an affiliate of "The Epoch Times's media empire".

China Uncensored is owned and produced by America Uncovered LLC, a New York-based company owned by Chris Chappell and his co-hosts that also produces the YouTube show America Uncovered and the podcast China Unscripted.

In April 2017, Apple TV temporarily blocked China Uncensored in mainland China, citing local laws, and also blocked the show in Hong Kong and Taiwan. The app was restored to Taiwan and Hong Kong after a petition gained more than 10,000 signatures, according to China Uncensored. According to Reporters Without Borders, the app was restored in China, Hong Kong and Taiwan.

Personnel

Chris Chappell is the primary host of the show. Originally from Los Angeles, California, in the United States, he lives in New York, where the show is produced. He told The Daily Dot that he became interested in Chinese culture at age 19 when he became ill and hospitalized. He told The Daily Dot that "the doctors said I might have some rare heart virus", but after a friend introduced him to qigong, he "got better the next day" after practicing. Regarding the creation of China Uncensored, he said: "I was a China news reporter and, eventually, I grew tired of the unbiased attitude you had to have as an unbiased reporter. I thought: 'Why not follow in the footsteps of The Daily Show or The Colbert Report?'"

Matt Gnaizda serves as the series producer and has substituted for Chappell as the series' host. Shelley Zhang is the program's "humor ninja" and also a co-host.

References

External links
 
 

Falun Gong propaganda
Political television series
YouTube channels launched in 2012